Banded frog may refer to:

 Banded banana frog (Afrixalus fulvovittatus), a frog in the family Hyperoliidae found in Ivory Coast, Ghana, Guinea, Liberia, and Sierra Leone
 Banded bull frog (Kaloula pulchra), a frog in the family Microhylidae native to Southeast Asia
 Banded rubber frog (Phrynomantis bifasciatus), a frog in the family Microhylidae found in Angola, Botswana, Democratic Republic of the Congo, Eswatini, Kenya, Malawi, Mozambique, Namibia, Somalia, South Africa, Tanzania, Zambia, and Zimbabwe
 Gunther's banded tree frog (Hypsiboas fasciatus), a frog in the family Hylidae found in Bolivia, Brazil, Colombia, Ecuador, French Guiana, Guyana, Peru, Suriname, and possibly Venezuela

See also

 Black-banded frog or Black-banded robber frog (Hypodactylus nigrovittatus), a frog in the family Craugastoridae found in Colombia, Ecuador, Peru, and possibly Brazil
 Broad-banded frog (disambiguation), either of two species of Ptychadena frogs in the family Ptychadenidae found in Africa

Animal common name disambiguation pages